The Men's United States Squash Open 2015 is the men's edition of the 2015 United States Open (squash), which is a PSA World Series event (prize money: $150,000). The event took place at the Daskalakis Athletic Center in Philadelphia, Pennsylvania in the United States from the 10th of October to the 17th October. Grégory Gaultier won his third US Open trophy, beating Omar Mosaad in the final.

Prize money and ranking points
For 2015, the prize purse was $150,000. The on-site prize money and points breakdown was as follows:

Seeds

Draw and results

See also
United States Open (squash)
2015–16 PSA World Series
Women's United States Open (squash) 2015

References

External links
PSA US Open 2015 website
US Squash Open official website

Squash tournaments in the United States
Men's US Open
Men's US Open
Squash in Pennsylvania